The Chilean cruiser Esmeralda was the first protected cruiser, a ship type named for the arched armored deck that protected its most vital areas, including its propulsion plant and magazines.

The British shipbuilder Armstrong Mitchell constructed Esmeralda in the early 1880s, and the company's founder hailed the new ship as "the swiftest and most powerfully armed cruiser in the world". One year later, the Chileans deployed Esmeralda to Panama to show the flag during an emerging crisis in the region. The cruiser was later used to support the Congressionalist cause during the 1891 Chilean Civil War.

In 1894, Esmeralda was sold to Japan via Ecuador. Renamed Izumi, the cruiser arrived too late to participate in the major naval battles of the 1894–1895 First Sino-Japanese War. However, it did see active service in the 1904–1905 Russo-Japanese War. Izumi was one of the first ships to make visual contact with the Russian fleet just before the decisive Battle of Tsushima. After the conflict, the aging cruiser was decommissioned and stricken from the Imperial Japanese Navy in 1912.

Design

Background 
Esmeralda was designed and constructed in an era of rapidly advancing naval technology, and it is today recognized as the first protected cruiser, a ship type characterized by the armored deck that protected vital machinery. Cruisers prior to Esmeralda were often constructed primarily of wood and nearly all still carried the masts and rigging required for sailing; Esmeralda was built of steel and carried no equipment for sailing.

The rise of protected cruisers echoed that of the French Jeune École naval theory, which catered to nations in a position of naval inferiority. As historian Arne Røksund has said, "one of the fundamental ideas in the Jeune Écoles naval theory [was] that the weaker side should resort to alternative strategies and tactics, taking advantage of the possibilities opened up by technological progress." To accomplish this, Jeune École adherents called for the construction of small, steam-powered, heavy-gunned, long-ranged, and higher-speed warships to counter the capital ship-heavy strategy of major navies and devastate their merchant shipping.

Within the Chilean context, Esmeralda was ordered in the midst of the War of the Pacific (1879–1884), fought between Chile and an alliance of Bolivia and Peru. As control of the sea would likely determine the victor, both sides rushed to acquire warships in Europe despite the determination of Austria-Hungary, France, Germany, the Ottoman Empire, and the United Kingdom to remain neutral in the conflict. Esmeralda was the most capable of these ships, and although British neutrality meant that it could not be delivered until after the war's conclusion, the Chileans ordered it with the intention of gaining naval superiority over their neighbors. 

Esmeralda was designed by the British naval architect George Wightwick Rendel, who developed it from his plans for the earlier .

Public reaction 

As the world's first protected cruiser, Esmeraldas construction attracted much publicity. A warship with a "truly modern appearance," according to a later naval historian, its capabilities were highly anticipated within Chile: it was financed in part by public donations and the country's newspapers published lengthy treatises on the cruiser's potential power. Chile's president, Domingo Santa María, said in 1884 that Esmeralda would keep the Chilean Navy on a "respectable footing."

William Armstrong, Armstrong's founder, was keen to promote his company's newest warship to increase sales. He boasted to press outlets in 1884 that Esmeralda was "the swiftest and most powerfully armed cruiser in the world" and that it was "almost absolutely secure from the worst effects of projectiles." He believed that the protected cruiser warship type, exemplified by Esmeralda, would usher in the end of the ironclad era. For the price of one ironclad, several cruisers could be built and sent out as commerce raiders, much like the Confederate States Navy warship Alabama during the American Civil War. This argument closely mirrored the emerging Jeune École school of French naval thought, and protected cruisers like Esmeralda were hailed by Jeune École adherents as "the battleship of the future."

Armstrong also pointedly noted that it was fortunate that Chile had purchased the ship rather than a country that might become hostile with the United Kingdom; with this comment, he hoped to push the Royal Navy to order protected cruisers from his company lest he sell them to British enemies instead. His remarks were later summarized in press outlets like the Record of Valparaiso:

The promotion did not end with Armstrong himself. His company added a weighty article in the Times of London that was anonymously written by Armstrong Mitchell's chief naval architect, and the Prince of Wales, the future King Edward VII, visited the ship.

These marketing efforts proved quite successful: by the time Esmeralda was completed in 1884, Armstrong had or would soon be constructing protected cruisers for over a dozen countries. Nathaniel Barnaby, the Director of Naval Construction for the British Admiralty (the department in charge of Britain's Royal Navy) would later write that Esmeralda and the ship type it pioneered "made the fortune" of Armstrong's company and was a major factor in the widespread abandonment of sails in the world's navies.

Across the Atlantic, the Army and Navy Journal published an interview with an American naval officer who expressed his belief that Esmeralda could stand off San Francisco and drop shells into the city while being in no danger from the shorter-ranged shore-based batteries covering the Golden Gate strait. "Chile has today the finest, fastest, and most perfectly equipped fighting war ship of her size afloat," he said. "She could destroy our entire Navy, ship by ship, and never be touched." This hyperbolic perspective was part of a larger effort to draw attention to the underfunded and under-equipped state of the United States Navy.

Analysis and criticism 
Like the Tsukushi design that preceded it, Esmeralda mounted a heavy armament and was constructed out of lightweight steel, a feature enabled by the Siemens process. Unlike the earlier ship, Esmeralda was far larger and had much more seaworthy design, including a freeboard that was  higher. It was also the fastest cruiser in the world upon its completion; had a better secondary armament; was able to steam longer distances before needing additional coal; and had deck armor that extended the length of the ship, with particular attention paid to the areas above the propulsion machinery and other important areas of the ship.

Still, Esmeraldas design was the target of strong criticism from the Admiralty, the department in charge of the British Royal Navy, especially in comparison to contemporary designs like their . The Chilean ship's freeboard was higher than Armstrong's previous design, but it was still a mere  from the waterline. It also lacked a double bottom, a heavily armored conning tower, and any provision for emergency steering should the primary steering position be destroyed in battle. Moreover, the design of Esmeraldas coal bunkers meant that if it was hit in certain key areas, water would be able to flow into a good portion of the ship. For Mersey, the same figure came out to  when a full load of coal was embarked.

Modern assessments have also veered toward the negative. Nearly a century after Esmeralda was completed, naval historian Nicholas A. M. Rodger wrote that Esmeraldas design suffered from a disconnect between what Rendel designed the ship to do, and the missions most small cruisers in the world, including Chile's, would take on in a conflict: the protection of their own maritime trade or disrupting an enemy's. According to Rodger, Rendel gave Esmeralda large ten-inch guns and a high speed so its captain could choose the range they wanted to fight at. This theoretically gave the cruiser the ability to destroy an enemy's most heavily armed and armored capital warships—but the same ten-inch guns were unnecessary for facing down enemy cruisers or raiders, especially as Esmeraldas armor deck gave it a margin of safety when facing ships with smaller weapons. Warship contributor Kathrin Milanovich added that the practical utility of Esmeraldas  guns was limited by the light build of the ship, which did not provide a stable platform when firing, and its low freeboard, which meant that the guns could be swamped in rough seas. Milanovich also pointed out the lack of a double bottom and the limited size of Esmeraldas coal bunkers.

Specifications 

It was designed for a crew of 296.

For armament, Esmeraldas main battery was originally equipped with two /30 caliber guns in two single barbettes, one each fore and aft. The ten-inch weapons were able to be trained to either side of the ship, raised to an angle of 12°, and depressed to 5°. Its secondary armament consisted of six /26 caliber guns in single Vavasseur central pivot mountings; two 6-pounder guns located on the bridge wings; and five  Hotchkiss revolving cannons located in elevated positions. The ship was additionally fitted for but not with three  torpedo tubes.

The propulsion machinery consisted of two horizontal compound steam engines built by R and W Hawthorn, which were fed by four double-ended fire-tube boilers. The engines were placed in separate compartments. Notably, the ship was not equipped with sailing rigging.

It also had cork mounted along the waterline with the intention of limiting flooding and increasing buoyancy in the case of shell penetration, but the cork's practicality was limited. The ship's coal bunkers were also designed to be part of the protective scheme, but as they were not subdivided, their utility if damaged in battle were also severely questionable.

While in Japanese service, Esmeralda was renamed Izumi and fitted with two /40 caliber quick-firing guns (in 1901–02), six /40 caliber quick-firing guns (in 1899), several smaller guns, and three  torpedo tubes. These changes lightened the ship, making for a displacement of  even while its machinery could still manage .

Chilean service 
Armstrong Mitchell laid Esmeraldas keel down on 5 April 1881 in Elswick, Newcastle upon Tyne. They gave it the yard number 429. The completed hull was launched on 6 June 1883, and the ship was completed on 15 July 1884, making for a construction time of just over three years. While the British government upheld its neutrality through the active prevention of warship deliveries to the countries involved in the War of the Pacific, Esmeralda was finished after the conclusion of the conflict and arrived in Chile on 16 October 1884. Nevertheless, with the United States having neglected their navy since the end of their civil war, Esmeralda allowed Chile to lay claim to possessing the most powerful navy in the Americas: their fleet was centered around the protected cruiser, two well-maintained 1870s  central-battery ironclads, and two 1860s armored frigates. Moreover, they could staff them with foreign-trained officers and highly trained and disciplined sailors.

Esmeralda arrived in Chile in October 1884. The following April, the Chilean government sent the ship on an unusual and statement-making voyage to show the flag in Panama, joining the great powers of France, the United Kingdom, and the United States. At least one historian has stated that Esmeralda was ordered to block an annexation of Panama by the United States, which had sent marines and several warships to the area, but another has argued that the various sources of information about the incident are contradictory and do not agree with that interpretation.

Chilean Civil War 

During the 1891 Chilean Civil War, Esmeralda and most of the Chilean Navy supported the victorious Congressionalist rebels over the rival Presidential-led faction. Esmeraldas commander Policarpo Toro refused to join the Congressionalists and was therefore replaced by Pedro Martínez. In the first days of the war, Esmeralda steamed to the port of Talcahuano in search of money and weapons. It then went further south to intercept the corvette  and the two  torpedo gunboats coming from Europe to Chile, but did not find them.

Later, Esmeralda left for the north of the country to participate with the rest of the Congressionalist squadron in blockading and controlling the ports in the area. On 19 February, during the final phase of naval operations in the north, it participated in the Battle of Iquique. Congressionalist troops, outnumbered, managed to retain that strategic port with the decisive support of the squadron, which bombarded the positions of the Presidential troops until they capitulated.

On 12 March, Esmeralda engaged in a prolonged chase with the steamer Imperial, an elusive transport ship that had a reputation for being the fastest on the coast, and had on occasion managed to bring reinforcements north for the Presidential cause. The engagement began in the early morning of that day in front of Antofagasta and lasted until night. Although Esmeralda was able to get close enough to fire shots at Imperial, the cruiser was unable to reach its maximum speed due to dirty boilers and therefore lost track of the transport that night.

One month later, the ship escorted the Congressionalist cargo ship Itata north to the United States so that it could take on a load of rifles, although to allay suspicion the two vessels parted ways off the coast of Mexico. In what would become known as the Itata incident, the cargo ship was detained to uphold American neutrality in Chile's civil war but escaped. The US cruiser Charleston was sent to hunt the cargo ship down, and press outlets published their opinions on whether Esmeralda or Charleston would prevail if it came to single combat. Although the two warships did meet in Acapulco, Mexico, no violence broke out. Itata reached Chile without incident but was returned to San Diego with the acquiescence of the Congressionalists.

In August, Esmeralda participated in the last naval operations of the war by supporting the landing of Congressionalist troops at Quintero Bay. On the 17th, it steamed near Valparaíso and fired three shots to alert the Congressionalists of its arrival. On the 21st, Esmeralda with the corvettes  and  engaged the Presidential ground forces during the Battle of Concón from the mouth of the Aconcagua River. Their gunfire did not kill many soldiers, but it severely demoralized the Presidential forces; Scientific American stated that their shells "raised fearful havoc". Finally on the 22nd, Esmeralda attacked the forts of Viña del Mar together with the ironclad .

Sale to Japan via Ecuador 

After the conflict, the Chilean Navy briefly considered modernizing Esmeralda in March 1894 amidst the quickly escalating Argentine–Chilean naval arms race. These efforts went as far as asking Armstrong to furnish plans for upgrading the ship's weapons, replacing its propulsion machinery, adding superstructure, and more. However, in November 1894 they instead sold the ship to the Imperial Japanese Navy, likely in an effort to raise the funds for a new armored cruiser. Japan agreed to purchase Esmeralda for million, using about a third of the funds that the Japanese Cabinet and Parliament had originally earmarked for the purchase of three Argentine warships.

The sale was complicated by the Chilean government's desire to remain neutral in the ongoing First Sino-Japanese War. To get around this, the Chileans induced the Ecuadorian government to act as an middleman by allegedly sending a considerable sum of money to Luis Cordero Crespo, the country's president. Under this plan, brokered by Charles Ranlett Flint's Flint & Co., Esmeralda would be sold to Ecuador. Their navy would take formal possession of the ship, then hand it to Japanese sailors in Ecuadorian territory. This would formally make Ecuador, not Chile, the seller.

When this plan was executed, there was some speculation in American press outlets that Esmeralda would remain with the Ecuadorian Navy for potential use against the Peruvian Navy. However, the cruiser was handed over to the Japanese near the Galapagos Islands as planned. This arrangement would later become known as the "Esmeralda Affair", and it was seized upon by Cordero's political opponents while kicking off the successful Liberal Revolution.

Japanese service 

Although the Japanese purchased Esmeralda with the intention of using it in the First Sino-Japanese War, the cruiser arrived in Japan in February 1895—too late to take an active role in the conflict. The Japanese Navy renamed the cruiser Izumi and employed it in the post-war invasion of Taiwan later that year. In 1899, the Japanese replaced the ship's secondary armament with quick-firing 4.7-inch guns and removed the ship's fighting tops to improve its stability. Two years later, Izumis ten-inch guns were removed in favor of quick-firing 6-inch weapons. Between the modifications, it remained on active duty with the standing naval squadron and took part in what the US Office of Naval Intelligence called "by far the most comprehensive" naval training exercise ever conducted by Japan up to that point. Deployed alongside much of the rest of the Japanese Navy, Izumi was assigned to a green water blocking squadron and a blue water attacking fleet.

Japan went to war again in 1904, this time against Russia. After the Japanese cruiser Akashi struck a mine in December 1904, Izumi was deployed on a patrol line south of Dalian Bay. Later that month, with the Japanese aware of the approaching Russian Baltic Fleet, Izumi was sent back to Japan for minor repairs so it would be fit for service in the coming Battle of Tsushima. When the Japanese Navy deployed to engage the Russian ships, Izumi was one of four cruisers to make up the Sixth Division within the Third Squadron, under the commands of Rear Admiral Tōgō Masamichi and Vice Admiral Kataoka Shichirō (respectively).

Prior to the battle, Izumi was assigned to support a line of auxiliary cruisers stationed in the Tsushima Strait. These ships were charged with spotting the Russian fleet so its Japanese counterpart could move into position to engage. However, this line was later described by historian Julian Corbett as "ill-covered," and Izumi compounded the issue by being  out of position on the morning of the battle (27 May 1905). Moreover, it had trouble finding the Russians after investigating erroneously located spotting reports radioed in by the auxiliary Shinano Maru at 4:45 am.

Around 6:30 or 6:40 am, Izumi finally made visual contact with the opposing Russian fleet; it was the first proper warship to do so. Correcting the previously mistaken spotting, Izumi shadowed the opposing warships for several hours, correctly identifying the lead Russian flagship as a cruiser of the Izumrud class, and reported their movements back to the main Japanese fleet. Izumi also warned off an army hospital ship and troop transport in the area so they were not caught by the Russians.

When the two fleets drew near for battle, Izumi was forced to turn away from heavy fire at around 1:50 pm; the change in course allowed it to cut off two of the Russian fleet's hospital ships, which were later captured by two of the Japanese auxiliary cruisers. Later in the battle, after the Japanese main battle line had 'crossed the T' of the Russian fleet and forced it to turn around, Izumi and several other lighter ships from various Japanese squadrons were caught in close proximity to heavy Russian ships. Izumi, however, escaped with minimal damage, in part due to the intervention of the Japanese battleships of the Second Squadron.

After the battle, Izumi and the rest of the Sixth Division were deployed to support the invasion of Sakhalin by escorting the army's transport ships.

With the conclusion of the war in September 1905, the aging Izumi was used for auxiliary tasks for several years. For example, the Japan Weekly Mail reported in February 1906 that the ship was to transport the former Prime Minister of Japan and the first Japanese Resident-General of Korea Itō Hirobumi to his post. On 1 April 1912, Izumi was struck from Japan's navy list.

Footnotes

Endnotes

References 

 Bainbridge-Hoff, W.M. Examples, Conclusions, and Maxims of Modern Naval Tactics. General Information Series, no. 3. Washington, D.C.: Office of Naval Intelligence, Bureau of Navigation, US Naval Department, 1884.
 Bastable, Marshall J. Arms and the State: Sir William Armstrong and the Remaking of British Naval Power, 1854–1914. Aldershot, UK: Ashgate, 2004.
 Brook, Peter. "Armstrongs and the Italian Navy." In Warship 2002–2003, edited by Antony Preston, 94–115. London: Conway Maritime Press, 2003. 
 ———. "The Elswick Cruisers: Part I, The Early Types." Warship International VII, no. 2 (30 June 1970): 154–176.
 ———. Warships for Export: Armstrong Warships, 1867–1927. Gravesend, UK: World Ship Society, 1999.
 Corbett, Julian S. Maritime Operations in the Russo–Japanese War, 1904–1905. Volume 2. Annapolis, MD: Naval Institute Press, 1994. First published in 1915.
 "Crucero 'Esmeralda' 3° [Cruiser 'Esmeralda' #3]," Unidades Historicas, Armada de Chile (Chilean Navy).
 Fuenzalida Bade, Rodrigo. "Capitán de fragata Policarpo Toro Hurtado [Frigate Captain Policarpo Toro Hurtado]." Revista de Marina Journal 90, no. 692 (January–February 1973): 108–12.
 Gardiner, Robert, Roger Chesneau, and Eugene Kolesnik, eds. Conway's All the World's Fighting Ships 1860–1905. Annapolis, MD: Naval Institute Press, 1979.
 Grant, Jonathan A. Rulers, Guns, and Money: The Global Arms Trade in the Age of Imperialism. Cambridge, MA: Harvard University Press, 2007.
 Hardy, Osgood. "The Itata Incident." The Hispanic American Historical Review 5 (1922), 195–225.
 Hurtado, Homero. "Resumen de las operaciones navales en la revolución de 1891 [Summary of naval operations in the revolution of 1891]." Revista de Marina Journal 76, no. 614 (January–February 1960).
 Jentschura, Hansgeorg, Dieter Jung, and Peter Mickel. Warships of the Imperial Japanese Navy, 1869–1945. Translated by Antony Preston and J.D. Brown. Annapolis, MD: United States Naval Institute, 1977.
 Lauderbaugh, George. The History of Ecuador. Santa Barbara, CA: Greenwood, 2012.
 López Urrutia, Carlos. Historia de la Marina de Chile [History of the Chilean Navy]. Santiago: El Ciprés Editores, 2007.
 Office of Naval Intelligence. General Information Series: Information from Abroad. 21 vols. General Information Series. Washington D.C.: U.S. Government Printing Office, 1883–1902.
 Milanovich, Kathrin. "Naniwa and Takachiho: Elswick-built Protected Cruisers of the Imperial Japanese Navy". In Warship 2004, edited by Antony Preston, 29–56. London: Conway Maritime Press, 2014.
 Perrett, J.R. "Some Notes on Warships; Designed and Constructed by Sir W.G. Armstrong, Whitworth, & Co., Ltd." Mechanical Engineer 34, no. 867 (4 September 1914): 211–13.
 Pleshakov, Constantine. The Tsar's Last Armada: The Epic Journey to the Battle of Tsushima. New York: Basic Books, 2008.
 Quiñones López, Carlos. "La Tercera Esmeralda [The Third Esmeralda]." Revista de Marina Journal  106, no. 790 (May - June 1989).
 Rodger, Nicholas A. M. "The First Light Cruisers." The Mariner's Mirror 65, no. 3 (1979): 209–230. .
 Sater, William F. Chile and the United States: Empires in Conflict. Athens, GA: University of Georgia Press, 1990.
 Scheina, Robert. Latin America: A Naval History 1810–1987. Annapolis, MD: Naval Institute Press, 1987.
 Scheina, Robert. Latin America's Wars. 2 vols. Dulles, VA: Brassey's, 2003.
 Schencking, J. Charles. Making Waves: Politics, Propaganda, And The Emergence Of The Imperial Japanese Navy, 1868–1922. Stanford, CA, US: Stanford University Press, 2005.
 Sondhaus, Lawrence. Naval Warfare, 1815–1914. London: Routledge, 2001.
 "The Recent Battles in Chile." Scientific American 32, supplement no. 829 (21 November 1891): 13240.
 Tromben, Carlos. "Presencia Naval. El Crucero 'Esmeralda' En Panamá [Naval Presence: The Cruiser Esmeralda in Panama]." International Journal of Naval History 1, no. 1 (April 2002).
 Thomas Cavieres, Federico. "Cruceros al servicio de la Armada de Chile [Cruisers in the service of the Chilean Navy]." Revista de Marina Journal 107, no. 798 (September - October 1990).
 Van Duzer, L.S. "Naval Progress in 1895." The United Service 15, no. 2 (February 1896), 167–184.
 Vio Valdivieso, Horacio. Reseña historica de los nombres de las unidades de la armada de Chile [Historical review of the names of the units of the Chilean Navy]. Santiago: Imprenta Chile, 1933.

Cruisers of the Chilean Navy
Cruisers of the Imperial Japanese Navy
Ships built by Armstrong Whitworth
Ships built on the River Tyne
1883 ships
Naval ships of Japan
First Sino-Japanese War cruisers of Japan
Russo-Japanese War cruisers of Japan